George Winfield Gregory Jr. (born June 5, 1938) is a former member of the South Carolina House of Representatives. He is a member of the Democratic Party. Gregory was born in Jefferson, South Carolina and attended Davidson College and the University of South Carolina, and was a lawyer who resided in Cheraw, South Carolina.

References

1938 births
Living people
People from Chesterfield County, South Carolina
Davidson College alumni
University of South Carolina alumni
South Carolina lawyers
Democratic Party members of the South Carolina House of Representatives